This is a list of Sites of Community Importance in Melilla.

See also 
 List of Sites of Community Importance in Spain

References 
 Lisf of sites of community importance in Melilla

Melilla
Sites of Community Importance